The Canton Center Historic District encompasses the historic rural town center of Canton, Connecticut.  Extending mainly along Connecticut Route 179, near the geographic town center, is a well-preserved example of a rural agricultural center in Connecticut, a role served until about 1920.  The district includes many examples of Late Victorian and Greek Revival architecture.  It was listed on the National Register of Historic Places in 1997.

Description and history
The area that is now the town of Canton was settled in the 18th century as part of Simsbury.  In 1750 it was given status as a separate parish, and it was incorporated in 1806.  The town center organized itself along a stretch of the town's major north–south road, now Route 179 that roughly parallels Cherry Brook.  It was here that the Congregation Church was located (current building dating to 1814), and a general store and other local services arose.  Cherry Brook was used as a power source for modestly scaled local enterprises, including sawmills and tanneries.  This rural center was eventually supplanted by Collinsville in the early 20th century as a more important commercial and civic hub, and development has consequently been limited since about 1920.

A roughly triangular section bounded by West and Meadow Roads extends the district west of the main road. There 84 contributing buildings, most of which are either primary buildings (houses, schools, etc.) or major secondary buildings like barns. Most of the buildings are wood frame residences, in Federal or Greek Revival styles, although there are a few examples of later Victorian architecture. No buildings appear to date from the earliest time of the area's settlement. One of the oldest surviving houses in the district is the Caleb Case House built in 1785. Non-residential buildings include the church, a general store and blacksmith's shop, and several district school buildings which have been altered for other uses. Major modern intrusions include a Jehovahs Witnesses hall and the 1941 Cherry Brook School.

See also
National Register of Historic Places listings in Hartford County, Connecticut

References

National Register of Historic Places in Hartford County, Connecticut
Victorian architecture in Connecticut
Greek Revival architecture in Connecticut
Historic districts in Hartford County, Connecticut
Historic districts on the National Register of Historic Places in Connecticut